Svay Chek River (Stung  Svay Chek, spelled also Stoĕng Svay Chek) is a river in north-west Cambodia. It drains into Tonlé Sap lake.
Stoĕng Svay Chek has a basin area of 1,249 km2 in Cambodia (total 2,104 km2), average runoff 3,464 m³/s.

References

Rivers of Cambodia
Tonlé Sap